The Woman Between Friends is a 1918 American silent drama film written and directed by Tom Terriss that was based on the novel Between Friends by Robert W. Chambers.  The film stars Alice Joyce, Marc McDermott, and Robert Walker. It was remade in 1924 as Between Friends.

Cast

Production
During filming, Walker accidentally shot at himself but was not injured.

References

External links

Films directed by Tom Terriss
1918 films
American black-and-white films
American silent feature films
Films based on works by Robert W. Chambers
1910s American films